Muhammad Azeem Farooqui is a Pakistani politician who had been a Member of the Provincial Assembly of Sindh, from May 2013 to May 2018.

Early life and education
He was born on 4 March 1962 in Karachi.

He has a degree of Bachelor of Arts from Karachi University.

Political career

He was elected to the Provincial Assembly of Sindh as a candidate of Mutahida Quami Movement from Constituency PS-107 KARACHI-XIX	 in 2013 Pakistani general election.

References

Living people
Sindh MPAs 2013–2018
1962 births
Muttahida Qaumi Movement politicians
University of Karachi alumni